Claudio Cirillo was an Italian cinematographer. He is best known for his collaborations with Ettore Scola, and work on prominent films such as Scent of a Woman (1974), We All Loved Each Other So Much (1974) and Crime Busters (1977).

References

External links 
 

Italian cinematographers
Year of birth missing
Place of birth missing